Ržišče is a settlement in the foothills of the Gorjanci Hills in the Municipality of Kostanjevica na Krki in eastern Slovenia. The area is part of the traditional region of Lower Carniola and is now included in the Lower Sava Statistical Region.

The local church is dedicated to the Mary Magdalene and belongs to the Parish of Kostanjevica na Krki. It is a 13th-century Late Romanesque building with a rectangular nave with a flat ceiling and a barrel-vaulted sanctuary.

References

External links
Ržišče on Geopedia

Populated places in the Municipality of Kostanjevica na Krki